Gunston is a South African brand of cigarettes, currently owned and manufactured by the South African subsidiary of conglomerate British American Tobacco.

History
Gunston was founded in the 1950s by the Winston Tobacco Company in South Africa. It was one of the most popular South African brands on the market until sales started to decline in favour of other brands such as Peter Stuyvesant and Marlboro.

On 28 April 1972, a trademark request for the words "Gunston cigarettes" was filed and it was approved on 19 June 1973. The trademark expired on 19 June 2004.

In December 1999, the Independent Online reported that Gunston, as well as brands such as John Player International Filter, Camel Plain, and Gitanes, could be outlawed if the manufacturers did not lower the tar content in these brands. The manufacturers had three months to comply with the regulation changes, and did so. The limits on the amount of tar in cigarettes were said to be in line with the World Health Organization recommendations of 1999, which stipulate that 15 mg of tar and 1.5 mg of nicotine should be the maximum. After two or three years these limits were to be reduced to 12 mg of tar and 1.2 mg of nicotine.

Advertising

Various magazine and poster advertisements were made to advertise the brand. Some ads also included Team Gunston (a Formula One team owned by Rhodesian racing driver John Love) and the "Gunston 500", a South African surf competition. The slogan that was frequently used was "Men Rate Gunston Great".

Some radio advertisements for Springbok Radio were also made.

Sponsorships

Formula 1
Gunston sponsored Team Gunston from  until . They were known as the first team who introduced tobacco sponsorship to motor racing when they sponsored Rhodesian drivers John Love and Sam Tingle in the 1968 South African Championship for Formula 1 and Formula 5000 machinery. Prior to the F1 sponsorship, the team participated in the non-championship race Rhodesian Grand Prix held at the James McNeillie Circuit in Bulawayo.

South African F2
Gunston sponsored Team Gunston in the South African F2.

Kyalami 9 Hours
Gunston sponsored Team Gunston in the Kyalami 9 Hours (also known as the 1000 km of Kyalami).

Surfing
Gunston sponsored the "Gunston 500" surfing championship. Originally it was called the "Durban 500", but once Gunston became their main sponsor, the name was changed. The sponsorship ended when tobacco sponsorship in South Africa was banned in 1999.

See also

 Tobacco smoking

References

1950s establishments in South Africa
British American Tobacco brands